Ancient Evil: Scream of the Mummy is a 2000 American-Mexican horror film directed by David DeCoteau. Also known as Bram Stoker's Legend of the Mummy 2, it was followed by a sequel, Ancient Evil 2: Guardian of the Underworld, released in 2005. In England, the film was the subject of a consumer complaint regarding its BBFC classification which gave it a 15-rating. The film was shot in Mexico in four days.

Plot
Somewhere in Mexico during the summer, an ancient Aztec pyramid, dedicated to the rain god Tlaloc, is discovered. It contains numerous artifacts as well as a remarkably well-preserved mummy. All of these items are transported to a university in the United States for study and display; the university is nearly deserted except for six archeology students and their professor, Professor Cyphers.

While they are preparing the artifacts for display, one of the students, Morris stupidly steals an amulet from the mummy's wrist; he gives it to one of the other students, a beautiful blonde girl, Janine to impress her to take her on a date with him tonight and kissing each other unknown to them, Norman has secretly watching them in the brush, whom he has a crush on named Stacey.

Janine has confession to Stacey in their dorm room that Morris stole the amulet from the mummy’s wrist to impress her and she knows that he was wrong to stealing, Morris and Janine went to the campus and Morris went to break into the kitchen to steal the beers on purpose. Don, Arlando and Norman angrily confront Morris of his stupidity behavior about the million dollar amulet, breaking the campus, going to the jail for stealing and everything.

Unfortunately, it turns out that another of the six students is actually a descendant of Aztec priests named Norman, and that he needs the amulet as part of a ceremony to Tlaloc. This student, Norman, resurrects the mummy and sends it to recover the amulet so that he can complete the ritual. The murderous mummy begins killing anyone in its way. The other students learn about the mummy and also discover that the planned ritual to Tlaloc could be extremely destructive. They attempt to survive the mummy's attacks and to prevent the ceremony, but one by one are killed. 

Stacey saw Scott outside that professor’s car was smashed and damaged on the windows at the parking lot, when the mummy kills Scott in front of her screaming, Norman wickedly dressed up as the Aztec priest to need her blood of the virgin and mummy has kidnapped the passed out Stacey, carrying her away to the museum where Norman tied her hands and feet up on the sacrificial table. Don has escaped from the mummy with his knife and learning about Norman to sacrificing Stacey as a virgin in the ritual to complete that means he’s going to kill her.

Eventually, the priest-student chooses Stacey, one of the remaining female students, to be a human sacrifice to Tlaloc; the last surviving student, Don, must rush to save her and stop the ritual, smashing the amulet into pieces on the ground, killing Norman and the mummy with his own knife and prevent the apocalypse.

Cast
 Trent Latta as Norman
 Jeff Peterson as Don
 Ariauna Albright as Stacey
 Michele Nordin as Janine (as Michelle Erickson)
 Russell Richardson as Arlando
 Michael Lutz as Morris
 Brenda Blondell as Professor Cyphers
 Christopher Cullen as Scott
 Christopher Bergschneider as The Mummy (as Anton Falk)

Production
An international co-production between The United States and Mexico, produced by the American production company Kremlin Films and the Mexican production company Azteca Catrinca S.A. Filmed in Baja California, Mexico in locations with museum and college in 1999.

References

External links

Ancient Evil: Scream of the Mummy review at The Science Fiction, Horror and Fantasy Film Review
review at UGO Entertainment Zone
Ancient Evil: Scream of the Mummy review at epinions.com

2000 films
2000 horror films
2000s monster movies
American monster movies
Mexican monster movies
Films directed by David DeCoteau
Mummy films
2000s English-language films
2000s American films
2000s Mexican films